OneFamily is a financial services provider based in Brighton and Hove, Sussex. It is a mutual society and as such has no shareholders, and is instead owned by its members.

History
In 2014, after gaining the backing of 95% of its members, Engage Mutual Assurance merged with Brighton-based Family Investments to create OneFamily, which began trading under its new name from April 1, 2015. The business was moved to Brighton.

OneFamily has 2.6 million customers across the UK and is responsible for £8 billion of assets under management.

Products and services
OneFamily provides a range of financial services including over-50s life insurance, insurance bonds, tax-efficient savings plans, lifetime ISAs, lifetime mortgages and independent lifetime mortgage advice. It also supports existing Child Trust Fund accounts that were created prior to their discontinuation by the British government in 2011, and replaced with Junior ISAs.

See also
 Engage Mutual Assurance

References

Financial services companies established in 2015
Companies based in Brighton and Hove
Friendly societies of the United Kingdom
British companies established in 2015